Provincial road N377 is a Dutch provincial road between Hasselt, in the province of Overijssel, and Coevorden, in the province of Drenthe. Parts of the road are expressway, mainly in between the A28 and Slagharen. The road consists of 1x2 driving lanes, with an exception of 2x2 lanes in Nieuwleusen and Balkbrug. There are a few grade-separated crossings. The road has a length of 44 km (27 miles).

Junction and exit list

References

377
377
377